2MAX FM is a community radio station based in Narrabri, New South Wales, Australia. The station has been broadcasting for over 15 years to the regional area after being granted a full-time licence in 2000.

2MAX FM can be heard in Narrabri, Wee Waa, Coonabaraban, Gunnedah, Moree and throughout the Narrabri Shire, broadcasting 10 KWatts from the top of Mount Dowe.

Codes of Practice
The station is subject to the Community Broadcasting Codes of Practice, as updated in 2009. The station was investigated for reported failure to allow Community Participation in Operations and Decision making. No breaches were found.

Programming
The majority of music played on the station is country, however there is a variety of genres including Folk, Rock & Pop, Classical, 50s, 60s, 70s 80 & 90s and Christian/Religious. This is what the community surveyed wants to hear. The station provides an easy to access outlet for Australian music artists.

The majority of presenters are over 55 and are volunteers.

A Programme committee governs the programmes that are put to air. Community radio is focussed on giving people a local voice, especially those who would not normally get access to the airtime.

This may include ethnic language programs, programs for the print handicapped, programming for gay and lesbian members, youth programs or niche music. In rural areas such as Narrabri, this is made much more difficult, as censorship and conservatism is the norm.

A recent addition to programming is the "Max FM Mornings" program. Between the hours of 9am-12noon presents information on the local community, including Bush Bargains, school news, Narrabri Shire Council Report by the Mayor, a local weeds report, and a What's On In Our Shire report.

History
2MAX FM began life as an aspirant community radio station known as Narrabri Shire Community Radio (NSCR). A small group of locals wanted a local radio station, and had discovered that there were community licences available. A public meeting was held, and a steering committee was formed.

The first test broadcast was from the Old Shire Council building, running at approx. 5 watts from a small antenna hung out the office window! The test broadcaster lasted a week, but was largely ignored by the Narrabri community.

A series of test broadcasts continued during the 1990s. Another community aspirant group raised its head in the late 1990s forcing NSCR into frequency sharing on a turn about basis.

The lack of financial support from the local community was exacerbated by this. Many business houses took a wait and see approach.

The full-time licence was finally granted in 2000 - when then-President Terry Hogan received the phone call, he was amazed at the lack of celebration. It was simply business as usual in Narrabri. The launching of MAX FM, coupled with a far more aggressive sales team lead to some limited acceptance by the local community.

A focus on the oldest members of the community seemed to be the right niche for MAX FM, with income, membership and technical growth was substantial.

Income
The station earns income from memberships, sponsorships, fundraising, and grants, which totals approximately $140,000 per year.

Technical data
Frequency - 91.3FM
Licensed Power - 10 Kw.
Effective Radiated Power - 10Kwatts
Studio automation uses "Raduga"

External links
 2MAX FM website
 CBAA website
 2MAX FM's Licence application to ACMA
 Investigation Report

Community radio stations in Australia
Radio stations in New South Wales
Radio stations established in 1992